Winklarn is a town in the district of Amstetten in Lower Austria in Austria.

Geography
Winklarn lies in the Mostviertel in Lower Austria. About 18.61 percent of the municipality is forested.

References

Cities and towns in Amstetten District